Barcroft as a personal name can refer to:
 Barcroft Boake (18661892), Australian poet
 Stacy Barcroft Lloyd, Jr. (19081994), American businessman, horse breeder, dairy cattle farmer and yachtsman

Barcroft as a family name can refer to:
 George Barcroft (before 1574c.1610), English composer of church music
 Sir Joseph Barcroft (18721947), British physiologist
 Judith Barcroft (born 1942), American Broadway and soap opera actress
 Peter Barcroft (19291977), English cricketer
 Roy Barcroft (19021969), American character actor
 Tom Barcroft (1870after 1909), English football secretary-manager

Barcroft as a place name can refer to:
 Barcroft, West Yorkshire, a place in West Yorkshire in the United Kingdom
Barcroft, a neighborhood in Arlington County, Virginia
 Barcroft Community House, a historic community center located at Arlington, Virginia, United States
 Barcroft Islands, a group of small islands in Antarctica named after Sir Joseph Barcroft
 Barcroft Park, a baseball venue located in Arlington, Virginia, United States
 Lake Barcroft, Virginia, a census-designated place in Fairfax County, Virginia, United States
 Barcroft TV

See also